The Performer is the debut studio album by English musician and Klaxons band member James Righton. It was released on 20 March 2020 under DeeWee Records.

Critical reception
The Performer was met with generally favorable reviews from critics. At Metacritic, which assigns a weighted average rating out of 100 to reviews from mainstream publications, this release received an average score of 75, based on 5 reviews. Yasmin Cowan from Clash Magazine said that the album "embarks on a cinematic journey with poignant lyricism, exquisite production and charismatically seductive soundscapes".

Track listing

References

2020 debut albums